Alvi Ahmed is a Bangladeshi director and script writer in both television and cinema. He has directed around 100 dramas and a full-length feature film. He was nominated several times for the "Meril Prothom Alo Awards". In 2015, his directed film "U-Turn" got released in more than 80 movie theatres around the country. He is a translator. He has also translated some stories and novels of the famous Japanese writer Haruki Murakami.

Early life and education
Alvi Ahmed was born on 11 October 1980 in the District of Gopalgonj, Bangladesh. He is the son of Mr. Nawsher Ali and Mrs. Jahanara Begum.

He has completed his secondary and higher secondary education from Barishal Cadet College. In 2005, Alvi graduated as an electrical engineer from Bangladesh University of Engineering and Technology (BUET). He was married to Jinat Hossain in 2016.

Film
In 2015, Alvi Ahmed finished working on his first Bangla movie U-Turn. Several Bangladeshi actors like Misha Sawdagor, Moutushi Biswas, Shahiduzzaman Selim, Shipan Mitra, Irfan Sazzad, Airin Sultana worked under his production. The movie was released in more than 80 movie theatres nationwide.

Drama
Alvi Ahmed has directed almost 100 TV dramas. Some of his significant productions are Batashe Muktir Grhan, Shunno theke Shuru, Vagabond, The Corporate, 2441139 (Bela Bosh), Neel Botam, Tahminar Dinjapon, Parallel Image, Shopner Moto Din

Translated book
He has translated a number of Stories written by Haruki Mukarami. In October 2020 he has translated Haruki Mukarami's popular novel Norwegian Wood in Bengali which was one of the best seller in Bangladesh.

Nominations and awards

Gallery

See also
 Riaz
 Taukir Ahmed
 Dhallywood
 Bangladeshi film actor
 Cinema of Bangladesh

References

Living people
1980 births
Bangladesh University of Engineering and Technology alumni
Bangladeshi film directors
Bangladeshi translators